Brooks, Meadows and Lovely Faces (translit. Brooks, Meadows and Lovely Faces) is a 2016 Egyptian comedy film directed by Yousry Nasrallah. It was selected to be screened in the Contemporary World Cinema section at the 2016 Toronto International Film Festival.

Cast
 Laila Eloui
 Bassem Samra
 Menna Shalabi

References

External links
 

2016 films
2016 comedy films
Egyptian comedy films
2010s Arabic-language films
Films directed by Yousry Nasrallah